The Jaenisch Gambit may refer to at least two chess openings.

The Jaenisch Gambit of the Ruy Lopez, also called the Schliemann Defence
The Jaenisch Gambit variation of the English Opening